The Priests of the Sacred Heart of Jesus of Bétharram (abbreviated SCI di Béth) is a Roman Catholic clerical religious congregation of Pontifical Right for men. It was established in Bétharram in 1832 by St. Michael Garicoits as fulfilment of a dream. The task of this congregation, dedicated to the Sacred Heart, was to evangelize the people through missions and to teach the young. It received formal approval of the Pope after Garicoits' death. 

They live in small communities of 3-4 persons in Argentina, Brazil, Central African Republic, France, Great Britain, India, Israel, Italy, Ivory Coast, Jordan, Palestine, Paraguay, Spain, Thailand and Uruguay.

References

External links
 
 Website

1832 establishments in France
Religious organizations established in 1832
Catholic orders and societies
Catholic religious institutes established in the 19th century